Morawitz is a surname. It is a Germanized variant of a Czech surname. It may refer to:

 Ferdinand Ferdinandovitsch Morawitz (1827-1896), a Russian entomologist
 August Feodorovitsh Morawitz (1837-1897), a Russian entomologist
 Paul Oskar Morawitz (1879-1936), a German internist and physiologist

See also
 
 Moravčík
 Morávek
 Moravek
 József Moravetz
 Morawetz

Czech-language surnames
Slovak-language surnames
West Slavic-language surnames
Slavic-language surnames